Benjamin Clemens (5 October 1875 – 27 December 1957) was a 20th-century sculptor who worked in London.

Early life
Clemens was born in Dalston, North London, the son of Richard Clemens, a salesman and warehouse worker originally from Cornwall. He received some schooling at Lonsbury College at Hackney Downs but at the age of 15 was working as a haberdasher's assistant. By his mid-twenties he was studying art, first at the North London School of Drawing and then at the Royal College of Art. Clemens submitted works to the British Institution's student competition, and his talent was recognized with a two-year scholarship in sculpture paying £50 a year and inclusion in the associated exhibition at the Tate Museum.

After his studies at the Royal College of Art Clemens was appointed assistant master under Professor Édouard Lantéri. He exhibited his sculpture regularly in major British exhibitions, including the Royal Academy's Annual Exhibition, where The Collector and Art Critic rated his entry one of only eight works of merit among 180 sculptures in the 1906 show.

In 1910 he showed Eurydice at Twenty Years of British Art at the Whitechapel Gallery.

First World War
At the outbreak of the First World War Clemens was 38. He served first with the British Expeditionary Force and later with the Royal Army Medical Corps. Following the war, Lieutenant-Colonel F.S. Brereton organized exhibitions by artists who had served in the RAMC. The first, in April 1919, was at Army Medical War Museum, at 76 Fulham Road, London. A reviewer for the British Medical Journal thought Clemens's plaster casts of the head of An Orderly, The Pick-a-back and the Camel-Cacolet  amply repaid the visitor's attention. Clemens also exhibited at a 1920 show by RAMC artists organised by Brereton at the Imperial War Museum. The museum then purchased two small bronzes—The St John's Ambulance Bearers (1919) and the VAD Worker (1920) for its permanent collection. 

Clemens's wartime experience also informed his work for various war memorials commissioned after the end of the conflict. A design of his for a memorial for a burial ground in France was shown at the Victoria and Albert Museum's July 1919 exhibition of war memorials.

In 1921, he collaborated with fellow RCA professor Arthur Beresford Pite on a war memorial for Cheadle Hulme, Cheshire, with Pite designing the Early English-style stone cross and Clemens sculpting bronze figures of a soldier and sailor mounted high on the sides. The same year, Pite also designed the war memorial at Harrow for which Clemens sculpted four figures.

In 1922, Clemens was commissioned by the British Military Nurses Memorial Committee to create a statue for St Paul's Cathedral titled Bombed. The cathedral did not accept the statue due to lack of space.

Post-WWI career
Clemens was one of several British artists to create lions for the 1924 British Empire Exhibition at Wembley. While Frederick Charles Herrick created a distinctly art deco lion for the exhibition's official symbol as did Percy Metcalfe for the exhibition medal, Clemens chose a more subdued approach for the six seated lions he sculpted in concrete for the Government Pavilion, taking a middle path between realism and art deco stylisation. New York's Art News described them as having been "treated with a formal restraint and severity that is wholly excellent". As Clemens's lions fronted the portico of the popular Government Building, they were a popular element in photographs and postcards from the exhibition. Two of these lions are now preserved at the entrance to Woburn Safari Park.

 
Clemens often produced monumental works in stone to fulfill commissions as part of major British construction projects of the early 20th century. During his life Clemens regularly exhibited at the Royal Academy of Art. His works were also often exhibited internationally including in Paris, Rome, Brussels and the United States.

He was appointed an honorary member of the Royal Society of British Sculptors in 1946.

After Clemens's death on 27 December 1957, his former student Gilbert Ledward wrote an obituary for The Times describing how Clemens's "own career was sacrificed in order to teach and he never received the recognition he deserved".

Selected works

Free-standing sculpture

 Works for the coronation of King Edward VII and Queen Alexandra (1902)
 The St John's Ambulance Bearers, bronze (1919)
 VAD Worker, bronze (1920)
 Hunters (1921, 1923)
 Sapho (c. 1921)
 Neme me impune lacessit (1924)
 The Knight (1926)
 Miserere mei Deus (1926)
 Remembrance (c. 1929)
 The Archer (c. 1931)
 Lion (c. 1931)
 The Blessing (1933)
 The Beggar (1933)
 Life (c. 1935)
 Andromeda (1938)
 Eurydice (1939)
 Work for St Paul's, Vicarage Gate, Kensington
 Completion of a bronze and ebony mace designed by George Kruger Gray for Westminster Abbey (1945), following Kruger Gray's death

Architectural stone-carving, concrete and bronze
 Carvings over the Piccadilly entrance to the Burlington Arcade, London, stone (1911)
 Frieze above cornice at Africa House, 70 Kingsway, London, stone (1922)
 Six seated lions in front of the Government Pavilion at the British Empire Exhibition at Wembley. concrete (1924)
 Sculpture at Mary Sumner House, Tufton Street, London, the headquarters of the Mothers' Union (1925)
 Sculptures of a boy and girl flanking a window above the new outpatients' entrance to the Royal National Orthopaedic Hospital in Bolsover Street, London, stone (1927)
 Sculpture at County Hall, Nottinghamshire (1939)
 Sculpture for War Memorials:Cheadle Hulme, Cheshire, Harrow, London, Men of Canterbury Memorial, Kent,

Notes

References

Sources
 
 
 
 
 
 
 
 
 
 
 
 

1875 births
1957 deaths
20th-century British sculptors
British male sculptors
Alumni of the Royal College of Art
People from Dalston
People from the London Borough of Hackney
Sculptors from London
20th-century British male artists